In mathematics, the concept of a relatively hyperbolic group is an important generalization of  the geometric group theory concept of a hyperbolic group. The motivating examples of relatively hyperbolic groups are the fundamental groups of complete noncompact hyperbolic manifolds of finite volume.

Intuitive definition 

A group G is relatively hyperbolic with respect to a subgroup H if, after contracting the Cayley graph of G along H-cosets, the resulting graph equipped with the usual graph metric becomes a δ-hyperbolic space and, moreover, it satisfies a technical condition which implies that quasi-geodesics with common endpoints travel through approximately the same collection of cosets and enter and exit these cosets in approximately the same place.

Formal definition 

Given a finitely generated group G with Cayley graph Γ(G) equipped with the path metric and a subgroup H of G, one can construct the coned off Cayley graph  as follows:  For each left coset gH, add a vertex  v(gH) to the Cayley graph Γ(G) and for each element x of gH, add an edge e(x) of length 1/2 from x to the vertex v(gH). This results in a metric space that may not be proper (i.e. closed balls need not be compact).

The definition of a relatively hyperbolic group, as formulated by Bowditch goes as follows. A group G is said to be hyperbolic relative to a subgroup H  if the coned off Cayley graph  has the properties:
 It is δ-hyperbolic and 
 it is fine: for each integer L, every edge belongs to only finitely many simple cycles of length L.  
If only the first condition holds then the group G is said to be weakly relatively hyperbolic with respect to H.

The definition of the coned off Cayley graph can be generalized to the case of a collection of subgroups and yields the corresponding notion of relative hyperbolicity. A group G which contains no collection of subgroups with respect to which it is relatively hyperbolic is said to be a non relatively hyperbolic group.

Properties 

 If a group G is relatively hyperbolic with respect to a hyperbolic group H, then G itself is hyperbolic.

Examples 

 Any hyperbolic group, such as a free group of finite rank or the fundamental group of a hyperbolic surface, is hyperbolic relative to the trivial subgroup.
 The fundamental group of a complete hyperbolic manifold of finite volume is hyperbolic relative to its cusp subgroup.  A similar result holds for any complete finite volume Riemannian manifold with pinched negative sectional curvature.
 The free abelian group Z2 of rank 2 is weakly hyperbolic, but not hyperbolic, relative to the cyclic subgroup Z: even though the graph  is hyperbolic, it is not fine.
 The mapping class group of an orientable finite type surface is either hyperbolic (when 3g+n<5, where g is the genus and n is the number of punctures) or is not relatively hyperbolic.
 The automorphism group and the outer automorphism group of a free group of finite rank at least 3 are not relatively hyperbolic.

References 

 Mikhail Gromov, Hyperbolic groups, Essays in group theory, Math. Sci. Res. Inst. Publ., 8, 75-263, Springer, New York, 1987.
 Denis Osin, Relatively hyperbolic groups: Intrinsic geometry, algebraic properties, and algorithmic problems, arXiv:math/0404040v1 (math.GR), April 2004.
 Benson Farb, Relatively hyperbolic groups, Geom. Funct. Anal. 8 (1998), 810–840.
 Jason Behrstock, Cornelia Druţu, Lee Mosher, Thick metric spaces, relative hyperbolicity, and quasi-isometric rigidity, arXiv:math/0512592v5 (math.GT), December 2005.
 Daniel Groves and Jason Fox Manning, Dehn filling in relatively hyperbolic groups,  arXiv:math/0601311v4 [math.GR], January 2007.

Geometric group theory